Mikkel Hess (born 1976) is a Danish musician best known for his ongoing collaborative project "Hess Is More". Other bands and collaborations include “Hess / AC / Hess Spacelab”, “3 x Hess”, "Small White Man", “2s and 4s”, “Hess / Vibskov Trommefredag” and “SH101 Nightmare”.

Mikkel Hess is also active as composer and producer of music for film, theatre and dance.
Later works include music for the ballet “UROPA” premiering at The Royal Theatre in Denmark in 2016 and music for the feature films “When Animals Dream” premiering at Cannes Film Festival 2014. and “Suicide Tourist” premiering at Sitges Film Festival in 2019. 

Over the years Mikkel Hess has also appeared as co-producer, co-writer and drummer on various albums by other artists.

Mikkel Hess graduated in 2001 from The Conservatory in Copenhagen (Rytmisk Musik Konservatorium) and is since 2009 part of studio and label This Is Care Of.

References 

Living people
1976 births
Danish musicians
21st-century Danish musicians